Debaryomycetaceae is a family of fungus in the order Saccharomycetales.

Genera 
The following genera are accepted within the family Debaryomycetaceae:

 Babjeviella
 Meyerozyma
 Millerozyma
 Nematodospora
 Priceomyces
 Scheffersomyces

The MycoBank online database additionally recognizes Debaryomyces and Schwanniomyces within Debaryomycetaceae, but Catalogue of Life places both within the family Saccharomycetaceae.

References 

Saccharomycetes
Ascomycota families